Austin McChord (born 1985) is an American businessman and computer engineer. He currently serves on the Board of Directors for Datto, a data backup company he founded in 2007. By 2015 Datto had a "purported valuation of $1 billion," making it the only "unicorn" company in the state of Connecticut. In December 2017 Datto was sold to Vista Equity Partners for around $1.5 billion and merged with Autotask, with McChord appointed CEO of the combined company. Named to Forbes’ annual 30 Under 30 list of leaders in enterprise technology in 2015, he is a periodic author for publications such as Entrepreneur, Business Insider, and TechCrunch.

Early life and education 
Austin McChord was born in 1985 in Connecticut,  spending his youth in Newtown, Connecticut. He developed an interest in technology by the time he was in the third grade, when he relates that his school had him use a computer in class to compensate for his bad handwriting. He soon started learning to program, and began writing games to play during class. In middle school he constructed Rube Goldberg machines, and while attending Newtown High School, he joined the Technology Club as a freshman. The club was responsible for the television station broadcast to the town, which McChord worked to upgrade from scrolling text to live TV and sports replays. Collecting old television sets from the dump, McChord repaired them and built necessary components for live sports broadcasts, also building his school's video-editing software. Graduating high school in 2003, he initially studied electrical engineering at the Rochester Institute of Technology. In 2009 he received a Bachelor of Science degree in bioinformatics.

Career 
While still attending college, throughout the summer of 2007 the 21-year-old McChord began creating a data recovery and backup device in his father's office basement. He recollects having an idea "around building a mass device that replicated data to servers in the cloud, and I thought I could build it cheaper than anything that was on the market.” He fashioned his first product using Linksys parts, Lego pieces, hot glue, a soldering iron, and his own software. McChord went on to secure several patents. His products take frequent snapshots of clients' server content and then encrypt and transmit the data to backup servers, allowing for quick reboots if client servers are hacked or crash.

He became the founding CEO of the company Datto to sell the product in 2007, with the product hitting the market in early 2008. Articles in blogs like Engadget and Gizmodo resulted in his first customers. He initially built a Linux-compatible backup device to market to a small number of resellers, before continuing to design new models.

In early 2013 McChord turned down a $100 million buyout offer from an unnamed security firm. McChord, who was Datto's sole shareholder at the time, disliked the firm's plan to dismantle Datto and lay off employees.  That fall McChord instead raised $25 million from General Catalyst Partners in growth capital, with Paul Sagan and Steve Herrod joining the Datto board as part of the deal. In December 2014 McChord acquired Backupify, a startup in Massachusetts which "backs up data in cloud apps such as Salesforce and Google Apps." 
 
After a Federal Bureau of Investigation (FBI) request and permission from the Hillary Clinton organization, in September 2015 McChord reportedly handed over up to 17,448 Clinton emails from Datto's servers to the FBI, as well as hardware. Datto received $75 million in funding from Technology Crossover Ventures in November 2015, with McChord saying he would use the funds to expand internationally. In 2015 he was named to Forbes’ annual "30 Under 30" list of leaders in enterprise technology. Also that year, Connecticut Magazine named him among the "40 Under 40" of Connecticut state.

In 2016 he won the Ernst & Young Entrepreneur of the Year New York Award, after being a finalist for the Ernst & Young Entrepreneur of the Year Award in 2014. He was also named a CRN Top 50 Midmarket IT Vendor Executive and a CRN Top 25 Innovator. With McChord continuing to serve as CEO out of Datto's headquarters in Norwalk, Connecticut, by 2015 Datto had a "purported valuation of $1 billion," making it the only "unicorn" company in the state of Connecticut. In November 2017 it was reported that Datto had been sold to Vista Equity Partners for over $1.5 billion, and merged with Autotask the following month with McChord as CEO of the combined company. By December 2017, Datto employed 1,400 people.

In October 2018, Austin announced he was stepping down as CEO of Datto.

Boards and writing 

A periodic author for publications such as Entrepreneur, he is also on the board of trustees for Rochester Institute of Technology (RIT). In May 2017 he was commencement speaker for RIT, and he donated $50 million to RIT in late 2017.

Personal life 

McChord is based in Norwalk, Connecticut. Among his hobbies are building drones and robots. Since 2018, he has been an organizer for the Norwalk Havoc Robot League, a robot combat event based in Norwalk.

See also 
List of Rochester Institute of Technology alumni

References

External links 
 Profile on Datto

1985 births
Living people
American chief executives
Rochester Institute of Technology alumni
American software engineers